The Egyptian Air Force (EAF), is the aviation branch of the Egyptian Armed Forces that is responsible for all airborne defence missions and operates all military aircraft, including those used in support of the Egyptian Army, Egyptian Navy and the Egyptian Air Defense Forces. The latter was created as a separate command in the 1970s and it coordinates with the Air Force to integrate air and ground-based air defense operations. The EAF is headed by an air marshal (lieutenant general equivalent). Currently, the commander of the Egyptian Air Force is Air Marshal Mahmoud Fouad Abdel-Gawad. The force's motto is 'Higher and higher for the sake of glory'. It was known as the Royal Egyptian Air Force until 18 June 1953 following the declaration of the Republic of Egypt by Muhammad Naguib.

The Egyptian Army Air Service was formed in 1932, and became an independent air force in 1937. It had little involvement in the Second World War. From 1948 to 1973 it took part in four separate wars with Israel, as well as the quasi-War of Attrition. It also supported the Egyptian Army during the North Yemen Civil War and the Libyan–Egyptian War of 1977.  From 1977 to 2011 it saw virtually no combat, but has participated in numerous exercises, including Operation Bright Star. Since 1992 the EAF has also provided aviation support for the police and other national security organizations engaged in the war against terrorism. In recent years the Air Force has acted in the Sinai insurgency, the Second Libyan Civil War and the Intervention in the Yemen.

The EAF primary role is the air defence of the nation, with secondary tasks of strike and army support operations. The EAF provides official government transport and carries out international search-and- rescue operations in the desert, the Mediterranean Sea, and the Red Sea.

In 2014 the IISS estimated the total active manpower of the Egyptian Air Force at approximately 30,000 personnel, including 10,000 conscripts, with reserves of 20,000 personnel. This contrasts with an estimate of some 35,000 personnel, with most aircrew being long-term professionals, in 2010.

History

Establishment (Royal Egyptian Air Force)

In late 1928, the Parliament of Egypt proposed the creation of an Egyptian Air Force. The Egyptian ministry of war announced that it needed volunteers for the new arm to become the first four Egyptian military pilots. Over 200 Egyptian officers volunteered, but in the end only three succeeded in passing strict medical tests and technical examinations.

These three went to No. 4 Flying Training School RAF at RAF Station Abu Sueir near the Suez Canal, where they were trained on a variety of aircraft. After graduation, they traveled to the United Kingdom for specialised training.

On 2 November 1930, the King of Egypt and Sudan, Fuad I announced the creation of the Egyptian Army Air Force (EAAF). On 27 May 1931 the Egyptian Council of Ministers approved the purchase of five aircraft and the building of an airfield at Almaza (Cairo) with a budget of 50,000 pounds. The aircraft chosen was the British de Havilland Gipsy Moth trainer, the five modified aircraft were flown from England to Egypt and on arrival in May 1932 the air force was founded and the Almaza airfield was formally opened.

The first commander of the EAAF was Squadron Leader Victor Hubert Tait RAF, a Canadian, former Senior Air Advisor on the British Military Mission in Egypt. Tait selected staff, weapons and initiated building a number of airfields. In 1934 the British government provided ten Avro 626 aircraft, which were the first real Egyptian military planes. A further 17 626s together with Hawker Audaxes for army cooperation and close support and Avro Ansons for VIP work followed shortly afterward.

In 1937 the Egyptian Army Air Force was separated from the Army Command and became an independent branch named the Royal Egyptian Air Force (REAF). New stations were built in the Suez Canal Zone, and the Western Desert.

During 1938 the REAF received two squadrons (Nos 2 and 5) of Gloster Gladiator biplane fighters and No. 1 Squadron of Westland Lysander reconnaissance aircraft, Egypt was the last state to use the Lysander in action, during the 1948 Arab–Israeli War.

Second World War

As the Egyptian border was threatened by an Italian and German invasion during the Second World War, the Royal Air Force established more airfields in Egypt.  The Royal Egyptian Air Force was sometimes treated as a part of the Royal Air Force, at other times a strict policy of neutrality was followed as Egypt maintained its official neutrality until very late in the war. As a result, few additional aircraft were supplied by Britain, however the arm did receive its first modern fighters, Hawker Hurricanes and a small number of Curtiss P-40 Tomahawks. In the immediate post-war period, cheap war surplus aircraft, including a large number of Supermarine Spitfire Mk.IXs were acquired.

A 1946 order of battle for the Air Force can be found in Jane's Fighting Aircraft of World War II, listing Nos 1, 3, 4, 5, and 6 Squadrons at Almaza Air Base, and No. 2 Squadron at Edku.

1948 Arab–Israeli War

Following the British withdrawal from the British Protectorate of Palestine and the establishment of the State of Israel on 14 May 1948, Egyptian forces crossed into Palestine as part of a wider Arab League military coalition in support of the Palestinians against the Israelis.  The Egyptian Air Force contribution included the Short Stirling bomber, Douglas C-47 Dakotas performing as light bombers and Spitfires.

Two Israeli aircraft were shot down and on 22 May 1948, Egyptian Spitfires attacked the RAF Ramat David airfield, believing that it had already been taken over by Israeli forces. The first raid surprised the British, and resulted in the destruction of several RAF aircraft on the ground, and the deaths of four airmen. The British were uncertain whether the attacking Spitfires had come from Arab or Israeli forces.  When second and third raids followed shortly afterwards, the British were ready and the entire Egyptian force was shot down – the last aircraft being baited for some time as the RAF pilots attempted to get a close look at its markings.

Relations with Britain were soon restored and the official state of war with Israel ensured that arms purchases continued.  New Spitfire Mk. 22s were purchased to replace the earlier models. In late 1949, Egypt received its first jet fighter, the British Gloster Meteor F4 and shortly after de Havilland Vampire FB5s.

Republican Egypt (Egyptian Air Force)
In 1955, Egypt made an agreement to buy heavy arms from Czechoslovakia, culminating four years of attempts. The Egyptian Government was determined to move away from reliance on British armaments. 1951 discussions had included 60–100 Mikoyan-Gurevich MiG-15 fighters. Initial Soviet bloc deliveries included the MiG-15s, Ilyushin Il-28 bombers, Ilyushin Il-14 transports, and Yak-11 trainers. Instructors from Czechoslovakia accompanied these aircraft. Egypt also began manufacturing its own Czechoslovak-designed Heliopolis Gomhouria (originally the German Bü 181 Bestmann) primary trainers at this time.

Suez Crisis

After the Egyptian Government's nationalisation of the Suez Canal in 1956, Egypt was attacked by Israel, France, and the United Kingdom in what came to be known as the Suez Crisis ("Tripartite Aggression" in Egypt). Heavy losses were sustained by the Egyptian side.  After U.S. pressure, the French and British withdrew their forces after seizing the city of Suez. The war also forced the EAF to begin rebuilding without British help.

In 1958, Egypt merged with Syria to form the United Arab Republic, and the previously separate Egyptian and Syrian forces were combined as the United Arab Republic Air Force. Though Syria left the union in 1961, Egypt continued to use the union's official name until 1971, including for its air force.

One of the first Egyptian Mikoyan-Gurevich MiG-19 units was the 15th Air Brigade, consisting of Nos 20 and 21 Squadrons, which became operational at Fayid with a forward location at Milayz in the early 1960s.

By the mid-1960s, British aircraft had been replaced completely by Soviet hardware. The Soviet Union became the principal supplier of the EAF, and many other Arab states. This allowed the EAF to greatly modernise and boost its combat effectiveness. The MiG-21 Fishbed arrived in the early 1960s, bringing with it a Mach 2 capability. The MiG-21 would remain Egypt's primary fighter for the next two decades. The EAF also began flying the Sukhoi Su-7 fighter/bomber in the mid-1960s. By 1966, Air Group 65, with its primary base at Cairo West Air Base, was operating three squadrons of Tupolev Tu-16 "Badgers": No. 34 and 36 Squadrons with bomber variants, and No. 95 Squadron equipped with the Tu-16KS' that could carry AS-1 Kennel air-to-surface missiles. In 1967, Egypt had 200 MiG-21s.

Egypt also took over the Helwan HA-300 from Spain as its first supersonic aircraft. It never went beyond three prototypes and initial test flights, then was abandoned due to high costs and political factors. The German designers involved had to leave Egypt after death threats from the Israeli intelligence agency Mossad.

Yemen War

The Yemeni Royalist side received support from Saudi Arabia and Jordan, while the Yemeni Republicans were supported by Egypt.  The fighting was fierce, featuring heavy urban combat as well as battles in the countryside.  Both foreign irregular and conventional forces were also involved.

Strategically, the Yemen War was an opportunity for Israel. It stagnated Egyptian military plans for the reinforcement of Sinai, by shifting the Egyptian military focus to another theater of operation.  Egyptian historian Mohammed Heikal writes that Israel provided arms shipments and also cultivated relationships with hundreds of European mercenaries fighting for the Royalists in Yemen. Israel established a covert air-supply bridge from Djibouti to North Yemen. The war also gave the Israelis the opportunity to assess Egyptian combat tactics and adaptability.

Egyptian air and naval forces began bombing and shelling raids in the Saudi southwestern city of Najran and the coastal town of Jizan, which were staging points for royalist forces. In response, the Saudis purchased British Thunderbird surface-to-air missiles and developed their King Khalid airfield near Khamis Mushait. Riyadh also attempted to convince the United States to respond on its behalf. In Operation Hard Surface, President Kennedy sent jet fighters and bombers to Dhahran Air Base from May 1963, demonstrating to Egypt the seriousness of his commitment to defending U.S. interests in Saudi Arabia.

Six-Day War

In the 1967 Six-Day War the EAF's combat capacity was severely damaged after the Israeli Air Force destroyed its air bases in a preemptive strike codenamed Operation Focus.  During the last four days the EAF conducted only 150 sorties against Israeli units throughout the Sinai. After the war, the Soviet Union replenished EAF stocks, sending large numbers of aircraft and advisors to Egypt to revitalise the EAF.

The EAF's first air-to-air victory is claimed by MiG-21 pilot Nabil Shoukry against a Mirage IIICJ fighter over Inchas air base two hours following the first Israeli strike.

On 8 June 1967, a pair of Egyptian MiG-21s engaged a pair of Mirage IIIs over the Sinai.  In the ensuing dogfight, the EAF's 1st Lt Fakhry El-Ashmawy managed to down one of the Mirage fighters while the second Mirage crashed from fuel exhaustion.

Initial Egyptian claims were even more inflated, but were later reduced to 72 Israeli aircraft destroyed. The IDF/AF admitted 45 losses on all fronts, while outside observers put the figure between 55 and 60.  Years later, unofficial Israelis sources admitted ten IDF/AF aircraft downed in air combat on all fronts.  Independent sources put this figure at 11, plus another resulting in fuel exhaustion. In fact, several Israeli aircraft reportedly downed by ground fire probably fell to Egyptian fighters.

Nigerian Civil War
During the Nigerian Civil War, Nigeria received air support from pilots of the Egyptian Air Force, who launched air raids against the self-declared republic of Biafra. The Egyptian pilots flew aircraft procured by the Soviet Union, air force Mikoyan MiG-17 fighters and Ilyushin Il-28 bombers.

War of Attrition

The years between 1967 and 1970 involved a prolonged campaign of attrition against Israel. The EAF went through a massive construction program to build new air bases in order to increase its survivability. During this period Egypt also received replacements for losses it suffered during the Six Day War. The EAF was the first branch of the Egyptian armed forces to achieve full combat readiness.

On 15 July 1967, six Israeli Mirage III fighters violated Egyptian airspace and orders were given for two formations each consisted of two MiG-21 fighters to intercept, another formation of 2 MiGs piloted by Major Fawzy Salama & Lieutenant Medhat Zaki was ready in West Cairo airbase. Indeed, the formation took off, but for protecting the airbase rather than supporting the interception.

October War 1973

During the initial surprise air attack of the Yom Kippur War, over 220 EAF aircraft took part. Unlike their Syrian counterparts, EAF aircraft evaded Israeli radars by flying below detection height. EAF aircraft were held in reserve after that point, mainly concentrating on airfield defence in conjunction with the SA-3 'Goa', while the more mobile SA-6 'Gainful' protected Egyptian forces at low and medium level, aided by the ZSU-23-4 and shoulder-held SA-7 SAMs.

Despite these limitations, the EAF conducted offensive sorties from time to time. The Su-7BM was used for quick strafe attacks on Israeli columns and the Mirage IIIE (sometimes confused with the Mirage 5), donated by Libya, carried out long-range attacks deep inside Sinai at Bir Gifgafa.

However, when Israeli armoured forces used a gap between the two Egyptian armies to cross the Suez Canal (Operation Stouthearted Men), they destroyed several Egyptian SAM sites, forcing the EAF into battle against the IAF. The EAF claimed victories and continued to contest IAF operations, while also launching attacks on Israeli ground forces on the East Bank of the Suez Canal. In most of these engagements, Egyptian MiG-21s (of all types) challenged Israeli Mirage IIICJs or Neshers.

The IAF did not operate freely and did not have complete air supremacy it enjoyed during the previous conflict, the 1967 war. Egyptian MiGs were used with better efficiency than before which included the tactics and lessons learned from the 1967 war.

It was during this war that the EAF applied the lessons it earlier learnt from the Israelis. A 32-year-old deputy MiG-21 regiment commander who has been flying since he was 15 recalls:
"During the war of attrition, the Israeli air force had a favorite ambush tactic", he told Aviation Week and Space Technology. "They would penetrate with two aircraft at medium altitude where they would be quickly picked up by radar, We would scramble four or eight to attack them. But they had another dozen fighters trailing at extremely low altitude below radar coverage. As we climbed to the attack they would zoom up behind and surprise us. My regiment lost MiGs to this ambush tactic three times. But we learned the lesson and practiced the same tactics. In the final fights over Deversoir, we ambushed some Mirages the same way, and my own 'finger four' formation shot down four Mirages with the loss of one MiG."

The Egyptian Air Force commander during the war was then-Air Marshal Hosni Mubarak. On 14 October 1973 one of many Egyptian/Israeli air engagements took place. Initial Egyptian reports that 15 Israeli aircraft had been destroyed. on the day of "Air battle of Mansoura". Later on, the Egyptian government changed the country's "Air Force Day" from 2 November to 14 October, to commemorate the Mansourah air battle. Mubarak was even promoted and feted as a national hero after the war, It was estimated that over 2200 take offs were done by the Egyptian Air Force throughout the war that included dogfighting and ground attacks.

Shaba I
During the Shaba I crisis in Zaire on 1977, Egyptian Air Force provided 50 pilots and technicians, who operated Mirage jets for the Zairian Air Force.

Libyan–Egyptian War

During the 1977 Libyan–Egyptian War, there were some skirmishes between Libyan and Egyptian fighters. In one instance, two Libyan Air Force MiG-23MS engaged two EAF MiG-21MFs that had been upgraded to carry Western weaponry. The Libyan pilots made the mistake of trying to manoeuvre with the more nimble Egyptian fighters, and one MiG-23MS was shot down by EAF Maj. Sal Mohammad, while the other Libyan aircraft used its speed advantage to escape.

Camp David Accords and Egypt-Israel Peace Treaty
Egyptian president Anwar Sadat and Israeli Prime Minister Menachem Begin signed the Camp David Accords, Egypt would receive 1.3 Billion military aid while Israel would receive 3.1 Billion in aid, ever since Egypt signed its peace treaty with Israel, Egypt shifted to American weaponry and drifted away from the Soviet style weapons. In March 1982, Egypt received its first 12 F-16 fighter Jets for its inventory.

From 1980 the EAF was involved in the joint U.S.-Egyptian biannual Exercise Bright Star.

Sinai Insurgency

The Egyptian Air Force operated on a large scale during the Sinai insurgency which commenced in 2011. AH-64 Apache helicopters and F-16 jet fighters bombed numerous militant targets on almost a daily basis.

Second Libyan Civil War

During the Second Libyan Civil War there were conflicting reports that Egyptian warplanes bombed Islamist militias in support of the government based in Tobruk. The foreign ministry denied any involvement in the conflict although unnamed Egyptian military officials claimed otherwise. Egypt tightened security on Libyan border following mysterious air strikes. Egyptian forces near the Libyan border have been put on high alert following airstrikes on 2016 Jan 10 from unidentified fighter jets inside Libya. The fighter jets struck Islamic State of Iraq and Levant (ISIL) targets inside Libya, according to news reports. The Libyan coastal city of Sirte has served as ISIL's capital in North Africa since the terror group seized the city last summer.

After receiving three MiG-21MFs and three Mi-8s from Egypt just half a year ago, it appears the Libyan Air Force is now further strengthened by two MiG-21MFs from the same source. The former EAF mounts are a welcome addition to the under-equipped Libyan Air Force, which is currently waging a war against Libya Dawn, Ansar al-Sharia and even the Islamic State, the latter centered around the Libyan city of Derna.

On 6 March 2016, Egypt and France began on Sunday a joint military exercise termed as the "Ramses-2016" in the coastal city of Alexandria along the Mediterranean. The French nuclear-powered aircraft carrier Charles de Gaulle is steaming through the Red Sea on its way to the Mediterranean via the Suez Canal for joint maneuvers with the Egyptian air force and navy in preparation for a reduced coalition offensive against Islamic State's deepening grip on Libya.

2015 Airstrikes in Libya

The February 2015 Egyptian airstrikes in Libya against Islamic State of Iraq and the Levant (ISIL) positions in Libya took place on 16 February 2015, and were triggered by a video released by ISIL in Libya a day earlier, depicting the beheading of 21 Coptic Christians from Egypt.

Within hours, the Egyptian Air Force responded with airstrikes against ISIL training camps and weapons stockpiles in retaliation for the killings. Warplanes acting under orders from the Libyan government also struck targets in Derna, reportedly in coordination with Egypt. It is believed that more than eight EAF f-16 jet fighters were used for the strikes, including the newly joined "block 52" versions.

The airstrikes had allegedly killed up to 81 ISIL militants, including three of the leadership, in the coastal cities of Derna and Sirte. Libyan media reported that at least 35 more Egyptians had been rounded up by ISIL in retaliation for the air raids.

2015 Military Intervention in Yemen

Egyptian Air Forces are participating in a Saudi-led joint regional military operation to halt the advance of Houthi rebels in Yemen, Egypt's presidency announced on 2015 March 25 in a statement. the Egyptian Air Force participated in airstrikes against Houthis in Yemen.

Egypt's military participation "through elements of the Egyptian air and navy forces" aims to support the Saudi-led regional coalition to restore stability in Yemen "under legitimate leadership", according to the Egyptian presidency's statement.

The Egyptian air force supported pro-government forces when they attacked Al Anad Air Base in the south of Yemen. "EAF and paratroopers aerial supported Yemeni ground forces who have now seized the military base killing scores of Houthi rebels".

2017 Airstrikes in Libya

On May 26, 2017, armed men traveling in pickup trucks gunned down 28 Coptic Christians and wounded 26 as the Christians were on their way to visit a monastery in Egypt’s Minya province, The Islamic State claimed responsibility for this attack. That same evening, Egypt announced that its air force had carried out six air raids on ISIS camps near the Libyan city of Derna. The strikes involved F-16C/D Block 52s covered by at least two Dassault Rafales.

Structure

Air Bases
Source:

Abu Suweir Air Base 
El Mansoura Air Base 
Borg al Arab Air Base  
Aswan Air Base 
Az Zagazig (Abu Hammad) Air Base  
Beni Sueif Air Base 
Bilbeis Air Base  
Birma/Tanta Air Base  
Almaza Air Base  
Cairo/Intl Air Base  
Cairo West Air Base 
El Minya Air Base  
Fayid Air Base  
Gebel El Basur Air Base  
Hurghada Air Base  
Inshas Air Base  
Gianaclis New Air Base 
Kom Awshim Air Base 
Mersa Matruh Air Base  
Wadi El Gandali (Khatamia) Air Base

Order of battle
Data from

HQ EAF Direct Reporting
38sq - Almaza (Beech 1900C)
99sq - Almaza (Falcon 20, Be200, Gulfstream)
Govt Flight - Cairo East (B707-366, B737-100)
102 Tactical Air Wing
25sq - Inshas (EMB-312 Tucano)
26sq - Ismailia (AT-802 Air Tractor)
35sq - Hurghada (EMB-312 Tucano)
104 Tact Fighter Wing
42sq – Wadi Abu Rish (MiG-29M/M2)
44sq – Wadi Abu Rish (MiG-29M/M2)
203 Tactical Fighter Wing
34sq – Gebel el Basur (Rafale EM/DM)
36sq - Gebel el Basur (Rafale EM/DM)
232 Tactical Fighter Wing
72sq – Mersa Matruh (F-16C/D)
74sq - Mersa Matruh (F-16C/D)
242 Tactical Fighter Wing
68sq – Aswan (F-16C/D)
70sq – Beni Sueif (F-16C/D)
252 Tactical Fighter Wing
82sq – Gebel el Basur (Mirage 2000EM/BM)
262 Tactical Fighter Wing
60sq – Abu Sueir (F-16C/D)
64sq - Abu Sueir (F-16C/D)
272 Tactical Fighter Wing
75sq – Genaclis (F-16C/D) 
77sq – Genaclis (F-16C/D) 
79sq – Genaclis (F-16C/D)
282 Tactical Fighter Wing
86sq – Fayid (F-16C/D)
88sq – Fayid (F-16C/D)
292 Tactical Fighter Wing
95sq - Cairo West (F-16C/D B52)
97sq - Cairo West (F-16C/D B52)
308th CAS Tactical Wing
57sq – Mansourah (Alpha Jet MS1/2)
58sq – Mansourah (Alpha Jet MS1/2)
516 Air Wing
 4sq – Cairo East (C-130H)
16sq – Cairo East (C-130H)
Ind Tpt Flt - Cairo East (Il-76MF) 
Air Wing - Flight Safety (Air Navigation School)
 2sq – Almaza (C-295M, An-74T-200)
533 Air Wing (Air Navigation School)
 8sq - Cairo East (C-295M)
544 Air Wing
 9sq - Beni Sueif (Mi-17)
81sq – Daraw (Aswan) (Mi-17V-5)
83sq - Bernice/Ras Banas (Mi-17)
545 Air Wing
11sq – Borg al Arab (AW149)
14sq - Borg al Arab (AW149)
37sq – Borg al Arab (SH-2G)
546 Air Wing
 7sq (VIP's) – Almaza (AW189, S-70A-21)
12sq - Mersa Matruh (Commando Mk.2)
18sq - Kom Awshim (CH-47D)
33sq (OCU) - Kom Awshim (CH-47D)
21sq - Almaza (S-70-21)
547 Air Wing
13sq - Uthman (Mi-17V-5)
55sq - Khatatbah (Mi-17V-5)
91sq - Quweisna, Ismaïla (Mi-17)
548 Air Wing
10sq – Abu Sultan (SA-342L HOT)
15sq – Abu Sultan (SA-342L HOT)
17sq – Abu Sultan (SA-342L HOT)
549 Air Wing
39sq - Wadi al Jandali (Ka-52)
40sq - Wadi al Jandali (Ka-52)
41sq - Wadi al Jandali (Ka-52)
43sq - Borg al Arab (Mi-24V)
550 Air Wing
51sq – Az Zaqaziq (AH-64D)
52sq – Az Zagaziq (AH-64D)
53sq – Az Zaqaziq (AH-64D)
.. 601 Air Wing
87sq - Cairo West (E-2C)
700 Air Wing
 6sq - Kom Awshim (EJune-30SW)
80sq - Kom Awshim (RPV-324 Scarab)
96sq - Beni Sueif (??)
702 Air Wing
20sq - Dakhla (Wing Loong)
22sq - Uthman (Wing Loong)
59sq (?) - Milaz (Wing Loong)
770th Tactical Fighter Wing
94sq – Beni Sueif (K-8E)
98sq – El Minya (K-8E)
101 Air Brigade (Air Force Academy)
 3sq – Bilbeis (Grob 115EG)
 5sq – Bilbeis (Grob 115EG)
201 Air Brigade (Air Force Academy)
28sq – Bilbeis/Inshas (K-8E)
29sq – Bilbeis/Inshas (K-8E)
Demo Team 'Silver Stars' (K-8E)
301 Air Wing (Air Force Academy)
30sq – Kibrit (SA-324L)
54sq – Bilbeis (SA-324L)
56sq – Kibrit (SA-342L)

Silver Stars Aerobatic Team

Silver Stars is the Egyptian Air Force aerobatic display team flying 10 K-8E Karakorum jet trainer aircraft painted in white, red and black colors. All planes are equipped with red, white and black smoke generators. During the shows, the Silver Stars performs eight different formations along with several single aircraft passes. Aircraft #6325 (Star 1) carries the name "Sharaf" after the team leader. Another team's planes also carried the pilots names painted at the K-8 nose. All pilots are flying instructors at the Egyptian Air Academy based in Belbeis Airport.

The Egyptian Air Force demonstration team "The Silver Stars" was formed in the mid of 1974 to participate at "October War" anniversary. Pilots of the team were flying instructors at the Air force College and flew four L-29 planes painted in dark green and brown and yellow – standard color scheme. In 1984, the Sliver Stars aerobatic team switched to six Alpha Jet training airplanes. In the following year, team's planes became nine.
In 2003, the team made the switch to the K-8E Karakorum trainer and from 2005 was led by Group Captain Mostafa Fathi.
Since 2010, the team is now flying ten aircraft – nine plus one solo.

Aircraft

The Camp David Accords caused a gradual change in the overall composition of the EAF. The EAF began to rely more on US, French and in some cases on Chinese aircraft.

The addition of these aircraft from multiple sources along with the ones already in the EAF inventory caused increasing serviceability problems. In 1982, the EAF began receiving General Dynamics F-16 Fighting Falcon fighters under the Peace Vector Program. Turkish Aerospace / TUSAS produced 46 F-16s for the Egyptian Air Force between 1993 and 1995 under the agreement signed between the Governments of Turkey and the Arab Republic of Egypt. As of 2015, the EAF received a total of 220 F-16s. 18 aircraft were lost in accidents and 7 F-16A/Bs were grounded.

These grounded F-16A/Bs were later overhauled, upgraded and returned to active service, additional F-16s were acquired to replace those lost. In 1986, the EAF received the French Mirage 2000 fighters, one was lost in a training accident. Egypt also license-built Alphajets, Tucano airplanes and Westland Gazelle helicopters.

In 1987 the E-2C Hawkeye Airborne Early Warning (AEW) entered service and was upgraded with advanced AN/APS-145 radars. The EAF also upgraded its F-16 fighters to C/D standard that enabled them to fire the AGM-84 Harpoon anti-ship missile.

The EAF currently operates 46 AH-64 Apache attack helicopters 36 of which were initially delivered as the AH-64A variant but were later upgraded to AH-64D standard. On 22 May 2009, Egypt requested the purchase of 36 Apache Arrowhead sensor systems as part of an order for 12 Block II AH-64D Apache helicopters. The number was later reduced to 10 Helicopters. 74 Grob G-115's and 120 K-8 Karakorum trainers were also ordered.

Modernization
Egypt made several deals with Ukrainian companies for the modernization of its old MiG-21 fleet but these deals were not implemented and all old MiG-21 fighters were taken out of service .

On 3 March 2010, the EAF ordered 20 Lockheed Martin F-16C/D Block 52 aircraft. The contract was set to complete in 2013 and included 16 single-seat F-16C and four twin-seat F-16D aircraft.
On 14 August 2012, the US Defense Department awarded a major contract to facilitate the procurement of F-16s by the EAF. The Pentagon selected American International Contractors for a $66.6 million contract to upgrade infrastructure for Egypt's order of 20 F-16 Block 52 aircraft, estimated at $2.2 billion. On 24 July 2013, the U.S. announced it would halt deliveries of the F-16s in response to the 2013 Egyptian coup d'état. In March 2015 the US announced the resumption of the deliveries of the F-16s, the last of which was delivered in October 2015.

On 16 February 2015, Egypt became the Dassault Rafale's first international customer when it officially ordered 24 Rafales, as part of a larger deal (including a FREMM multipurpose frigate and a supply of missiles) worth US$5.9 billion (€5.2 billion). In July 2015, the official ceremony, marking the acceptance by Egypt of its first 3 Rafales, was held at the Dassault Aviation flight test center in Istres. In January 2016, Egypt received three more Rafale fighters, raising the number of Rafales in service to six. All six aircraft are two-seat models and were diverted from delivery to the French Air Force; Egypt's total 24-plane order is for 8 single-seat models and 16 two-seaters.

In April 2014, it was reported that Egypt plans to order 24 MiG-35 fighters as part of an arms deal with Russia. MiG head Sergei Korotkov said at the 2015 Aero India exposition they will provide the fighters if Egypt orders them and are ready to negotiate. Russia agreed on a contract with Egypt for 46 MiG-29M/M2 fighters and it is expected to be worth up to $2 billion. Russia plans to supply the Egyptian MiG-29M/M2s with 40 high precision targeting pods. Deliveries would begin in 2016.

Russia and Egypt signed a contract for delivery of 50 Ka-52 helicopters. The Ka-52's will be equipped with the new OES-52 targeting system allowing it to launch Vikhr and Ataka anti-tank missiles using laser target direction systems. The execution of the contract will start in 2016 until 2018.

SAGEM and AOI-Aircraft Factory have signed a collaboration agreement concerning the Patroller UAV. AOI-Aircraft Factory could handle final assembly of the drones and will develop a dedicated training center in Egypt to train staff for the operation and maintenance of the drone systems.

On 18 April 2016, Egypt signed a contract with France for the sale of a military telecommunications satellite after discussions between the Egyptian and French presidents and between the Ministers of Defense, which took place during a visit by French President Francois Hollande to Cairo. The satellite will be supplied by Airbus Defence and Space and Thales Alenia Space. The price of the contract wasn't announced but is estimated at 600 million euros.

In December 2015, Russian Helicopters agreed to provide after-sales service and maintenance for the Egyptian Air Force's fleet of 41 Mi-8Ts and 3 Mi-17-1V helicopters in Russia. Under the agreement, the Egyptian repair plant at Helwan Factory (HFDI), an enterprise owned by the Arab Organization for Industrialization, will be authorized as an aircraft repair plant able to carry out comprehensive repairs to Mi-8T, Mi-17-1V and Mi-17V-5 helicopters operated in Egypt. In order to support repair work to the frames, components, gears and rotor systems in the helicopters, the company will deliver equipment for the production line, provide design and technical support and transfer all the necessary documentation to the Egyptian side for a two-year period. Egyptian specialists will be trained to carry out such repairs at the company's Novosibirsk Aircraft Repair Plant.

In September 2016, Russian Helicopters delivered the first 3 refurbished Mi-8T helicopters to the Egyptian Air Force after a major overhaul. The company also announced that the necessary equipment for the retooling and upgrading of the Helwan Factory aircraft repair plant had been prepared for shipment and that the Egyptian service technicians had completed training.

In August 2019, the Royal Jordanian Air Force transferred two of its Ilyushin Il-76MF aircraft to the Egyptian Air Force. The two aircraft are unique because they are the only stretched version of the famous Il-76 air-frame.

On 4 May 2021, France agreed to sell Egypt an additional 30 Dassault Rafale warplanes in a 4 billion euro ($4.8 billion) deal.

On March 15, 2022, The United States agreed to sell Egypt F-15s, the offer's amount of planes and price is to be determined.

Current inventory

Historical aircraft

Future

Egypt is in an advanced stage of negotiations for the purchase of the Russian strategic air lifter Il-76MD-90A. The first export contracts of the aircraft were to be signed within 4–6 months after the MAKS-2015 air show.

In 2014, Egypt planned to sign a large arms deal with Russia for the purchase of 24 MiG-35 fighter jets. In February 2015, MiG Director General Sergei Korotkov announced that the company was ready to supply the MiG-35 jets to Egypt should the country request them. However, in April 2015, Egypt signed a $2 billion contract for the purchase of 46 MiG-29M/M2 multi-role fighters instead.

Rosoboronexport and the Russian Helicopters holding are engaged in consultations with their Egyptian partners concerning a possible acquisition of Kamov Ka-52K ship-based helicopters for the 2 Mistral-class helicopter carriers that Egypt has agreed to buy from France. An Egyptian Air Force delegation had access to the helicopter before the official opening of the MAKS-2015.

In March 2019, it was reported that Egypt had reached an initial agreement with Russia for the sale of "over 20" Su-35 air superiority fighters in a deal valued at about US$2 billion. Deliveries are expected to begin as early as 2020 or 2021. However, deputy head of the Rosoboronexport Sergei Kornev denied any contract regarding the supply of Su-35 fighters to Egypt has been signed. In May 2020 Russia reportedly started producing the Su-35 under a contract with Egypt that was signed in 2018. Pictures taken in July 2020 reportedly show five Su-35 in EAF camouflage on their delivery voyage. Possible future orders for more Su-35 and the new Mig-35.

As of January 5, 2022, Egypt, Algeria, and Indonesia have cancelled plans of purchasing the SU-35 Jet.

On March 15, 2022, The United States agreed to sell Egypt F-15s, the offer's amount of planes and price is to be determined.

Munitions

Aircraft insignia
The roundel of the EAF consists of three circles, with the outside one being red, the middle one white, and the inner one being black, matching the Egyptian flag. Former roundels of the EAF included a similar variant with two green stars used from 1961 to 1973, and one with the old Egyptian crescent and three stars on a green background. Changes in markings reflect political changes.

Roundels

Tail marking

Egyptian Air Force ranks

Officers

Enlisted

See also
List of air forces
National Authority for Remote Sensing and Space Sciences
Atef Sadat

Notes

References 
 
 Nicolle, David. "Arab-Italian Fighters: Fiats and Macchis in Egyptian and Syrian Service 1948-1956". Air Enthusiast, No. 55, Autumn 1994, pp. 32–36. 

 
 .

External links

Egyptian Air Force Overview from Scramble
Pictures of the Egyptian Air Force
War of Attrition and the October 1973 War
Al Quwwat al Jawwiya Ilmisriya Egyptian Air Force – EAF
Boeing Chinook modernisation programme for Egyptian Air Force is on track
Site of Egyptian Air Force Academy

 
Military units and formations established in 1937
Military aviation in Africa
1937 establishments in Egypt

hu:Egyiptom hadereje#Légierő